Guraleus flavescens is a species of sea snail, a marine gastropod mollusk in the family Mangeliidae.

Description
(Original description) The shell is ovately fusiformly turreted, solid, pale buff, sometimes tinged with yellowish orange on the ribs. It contains 6½ whorls, conspicuously angled below the sutures and longitudinally distantly stoutly ribbed. The ribs are sharply nodulous at the angle, the lower half of the body whorl finely transversely ridged. The aperture is elongately ovate. The outer lip is flattened inwards. The posterior sinus is moderate, slanting upwards.

Distribution
This marine species is endemic to Australia and can be found off Western Australia, New South Wales and Tasmania.

References

 Laseron, C. 1954. Revision of the New South Wales Turridae (Mollusca). Australian Zoological Handbook. Sydney : Royal Zoological Society of New South Wales 1-56, pls 1-12.

External links
  Tucker, J.K. 2004 Catalog of recent and fossil turrids (Mollusca: Gastropoda). Zootaxa 682:1-1295.
  Hedley, C. 1922. A revision of the Australian Turridae. Records of the Australian Museum 13(6): 213-359, pls 42-56 

flavescens
Gastropods described in 1877
Gastropods of Australia